Christen Heiberg (21 February 1737 – 21 April 1801) was a Norwegian civil servant.

He was born in Vinje. He served as County Governor of Finnmark from 1778 to 1787. He died in Neksø, Denmark, in 1801.

References

1737 births
1801 deaths
People from Vinje
County governors of Norway